Michal Parnas is an Israeli theoretical computer scientist known for her work on property testing and sublinear-time algorithms. She is a professor of computer science at the Academic College of Tel Aviv-Yafo in Israel, where she was a founding faculty member and was also the dean of the school of computer science from 2011 to 2016. Since October 2022 she is the vice president of academic affairs of the college.

Parnas is the daughter of neurobiologist  (1935–2012). She was a master's student at the Hebrew University of Jerusalem, working with Avi Wigderson on a 1990 master's thesis on Approximate Counting, Almost Uniform Generation and Random Walks. She completed her Ph.D. at the Hebrew University in 1994. Her dissertation, Robust Algorithms and Data Structures for Information Retrieval, was jointly supervised by Danny Dolev and Noam Nisan. She is the co-author of a book in Hebrew on discrete mathematics, with Nati Linial.

References

External links
Home page

Year of birth missing (living people)
Living people
Israeli women computer scientists
Israeli computer scientists
Theoretical computer scientists
Hebrew University of Jerusalem alumni